"Long Promised Road" is a song by the American rock band the Beach Boys from their 1971 album Surf's Up. It was written by Carl Wilson and Jack Rieley. Aside from a few guitar instrumentals written in the early days of the band and collective co-writing credits, the song is  Wilson's first solo composition, and he plays all of the instruments himself.

Background
Asked about the song in a 2013 interview, Jack Rieley said:

Release
The song was first released as a single in May 1971, and did not chart. It was then included on Surf's Up, and was re-released as a single, with a different b-side, "'Til I Die", in October of the same year. This time it made it to No. 89 on the Billboard Hot 100.

Brian Wilson, who has included the song in his solo setlist, described the song as "an incredible tune."

Personnel
Credits from Craig Slowinski

The Beach Boys
Al Jardine - backing vocals
Bruce Johnston - backing vocals
Mike Love - backing vocals
Brian Wilson - backing vocals
Carl Wilson - lead and backing vocals, Wurlitzer electric pianos, grand piano, upright piano, Hammond organ, Moog synthesizer, electric and acoustic guitars, drums, tambourine, shakers, temple blocks, ride cymbal swell

Guests
Diane Rovell - backing vocals
Marilyn Wilson - backing vocals

References

External links
 

1971 singles
The Beach Boys songs
Songs written by Carl Wilson
Songs written by Jack Rieley
Song recordings produced by the Beach Boys
Reprise Records singles
Songs about roads